The following list of Kansas companies includes notable companies that are, or once were, headquartered in Kansas.

Companies based in Kansas

A
 Associated Wholesale Grocers
 AMC Theatres

B
 Beechcraft
 Big Dog Motorcycles
 Black & Veatch

C
 Cargill Meat Solutions
 Cessna
 CivicPlus
 CoreFirst Bank & Trust
 CZ-USA

D
 Dillons

E
 Emprise Bank
 Evergy

F
 Ferrellgas
 Freddy's Frozen Custard & Steakburgers

G
 Garmin

H
 Hill's Pet Nutrition
 Houlihan's

K
 Koch Industries

L
 Learjet
 Lee

N
 Netsmart Technologies

P
 Price Chopper

R
 RSI Corporation

S
 Seaboard Corporation
 SendThisFile
 Spangles 
 Spirit AeroSystems
 Sprint Corporation

T
 Taco Tico
 Textron Aviation

W
 Warren Theatres
 Watco

Y
 YRC Worldwide

Companies formerly based in Kansas

A
 Ace Aircraft Manufacturing Company
 Aerial Distributors
 Affiliated Foods Midwest
 Air Midwest
 ALCO Stores
 Applebee's

C
 Coleman Company

D
 Dickinson Theatres

E
 Embarq

F
 Fuller Brush Company

H
 Hesston Corporation

I
 IFR Systems

L
 LiveWatch Security
 Lone Star Steakhouse & Saloon

M
 Mentholatum

P
 Payless ShoeSource
 Pizza Hut
 Planet Sub

R
 Range Life Records

W
 White Castle

Kansas
Kansas-related lists